Sanches is a Portuguese surname. The Spanish version of this name is Sánchez. Notable people with the surname include:

 Afonso Sanches (1289–1329), Portuguese nobleman
 António Nunes Ribeiro Sanches (1699–1783), Portuguese physician and philosopher 
 Brian Sanches (born 1978), American baseball player
 Francisco Sanches (c.1550–1623), Portuguese-Galician philosopher
 Manuel Estêvão Sanches (born 1979), Portuguese-Cape Verdean footballer
 Renato Sanches (born 1997), Portuguese footballer
 Simon Sanches, Dutch navy nurse and laboratory technician who planned to commit a coup d'état in Suriname

Portuguese-language surnames
Patronymic surnames
Surnames from given names